James Peter Robson  is the team doctor for the Scotland national rugby union team. He works as a physiotherapist and general practitioner and, as part of the medical team, has been to six Rugby World Cups with the Scotland team and on six British & Irish Lions tours.

Early life
Robson is originally from Whitehaven in Cumbria. He played rugby for Edinburgh Wanderers.

Career
He studied at Queen Margaret College in Edinburgh, graduating in 1980 and then worked as a physiotherapist in the Royal Infirmary of Edinburgh. In 1982 he went on to study medicine at the University of Dundee. While a medical student he became the physiotherapist with district side North and Midlands. After graduating with a medical degree he went on to work as a general practitioner in Dundee for 13 years and continued to be located in the city after this.

His first trip with the Scotland team was to Canada in 1991. He was the physiotherapist for the team at the 1991 Rugby World Cup.

The Scottish Rugby Union nominated him to be on the medical on the 1993 British Lions tour to New Zealand. On the 1997 British Lions tour to South Africa, Robson was involved with the immediate care of Will Greenwood when he sustained an injury that left him unconscious.

Robson was on duty with the Scotland team at the Millennium Stadium in 2009 when Thom Evans suffered serious injury and he attended to the player on the pitch. In December 2012, it was announced that he would lead the medical team on the 2013 British & Irish Lions tour to Australia, his sixth successive Lions tour.

Honours and awards
In 2010 he was awarded a fellowship of Royal College of Surgeons of Edinburgh.

He was made a Member of the Order of the British Empire (MBE) in the 2018 New Year Honours.

References

Scottish general practitioners
Alumni of Queen Margaret University
Alumni of the University of Dundee
20th-century Scottish medical doctors
21st-century Scottish medical doctors
Fellows of the Royal College of General Practitioners
Fellows of the Royal College of Surgeons of Edinburgh
Members of the Order of the British Empire
People from Whitehaven
Living people
Year of birth missing (living people)
20th-century surgeons